FC Zarya Leninsk-Kuznetsky is an association football team from Leninsk-Kuznetsky, Russia. It played professionally from 1990 to 1999 and from 2005 to 2007, including 5 seasons (1993–1997) in the second-highest Russian First Division.

In 1997, it reached the quarterfinals of the Russian Cup, knocking out two Russian Premier League teams (FC KAMAZ-Chally Naberezhnye Chelny and PFC CSKA Moscow).

Team name history
1990–1991 Shakhtyor Leninsk-Kuznetsky
1992–1999, 2004—2009 Zarya Leninsk-Kuznetsky
2000–2001 Shakhtyor Leninsk-Kuznetsky
2002–2003 Zarya-UOR Leninsk-Kuznetsky
2010–present Zarya-SUEK Leninsk-Kuznetsky

External links
 Team history at KLISF

Association football clubs established in 1990
Football clubs in Russia
Sport in Kemerovo Oblast
1990 establishments in Russia